Tan Sri Loh Boon Siew (1915 – 1995) also known by locals as “Mr Honda”, was a Penangite tycoon and the first sole distributor of Honda motorcycles in Malaysia.

Early life
Loh Boon Siew was born in Hui'an County, Fujian, China. He spent his childhood collecting pig dung (used as fuel) to make a living. At the age of 12, he arrived in Penang from China with five friends, among them Loh Poh Heng and Loh Say Bee. He had no formal education and could only speak in his mother tongue of Hokkien. He worked as an apprentice car mechanic upon his arrival.

Business
At age 18, Boon Siew purchased 11 buses using his $2,000 in savings. He reconditioned the buses and sold them for $12,000. Next, he used the money he earned to buy another 39 buses. In 1942, during World War II, his money was confiscated by the invading Japanese army.  After World War II, he started selling bicycles, tires and motorcycle accessories, and soon he expanded his business to used cars, transports and buses.

In the 1950s, Boon Siew went into property development with his friends Say Bee and Poh Heng by building residential villas in Taman Saw Kit in Penang. His work is continued by his Boon Siew Group.

Boon Siew arranged to meet with Mr. Soichiro Honda, the Honda Super Cub's creator, and quickly convinced him to set up a Honda subsidiary in Malaysia.

The first Malaysian Honda showroom was set up on Pitt Street in Penang, very near the home of Boon Siew. The Japanese Honda Motor Co Ltd soon appointed Boon Siew the sole distributor for Honda motorbikes in the country, as the first 50 units of Honda 4-stroke Cub were being imported into Malaysia.

A factory was built in Penang to assemble the Honda Cub and the Honda motorcycle assembled in Malaysia was renamed the Boon Siew Honda. The Honda Cub became the bestselling motorcycle in Malaysia and Boon Siew was recognized as the first person to bring the Honda Cub motorcycles into Southeast Asia. The popular Cantonese word Cub 仔 (transcribed as "kapchai" in informal Malay), which means "small (Honda) Cub" and is now a generic for small underbone motorcycles in Malaysia, originates from the Honda Cub.

Boon Siew also played a role in the brief merger between Kwong Wah Yit Poh and The Star (Malaysia) in 1974, and helped with the establishment of the Lam Wah Ee Hospital and the Penang Old Folks Home.

He died at the age of 79 on 16 February 1995. To memorialize his contributions to the automotive industry, a road called Jalan Loh Boon Siew was named after him in George Town, Penang.

Honours
  :
  Officer of the Order of the Defender of the Realm (KMN) (1967)
  Companion of the Order of Loyalty to the Crown of Malaysia (JSM) (1976)
  Commander of the Order of Loyalty to the Crown of Malaysia (PSM) - Tan Sri (1988)

References

 
 
 
 
 
 
 
 

1915 births
1995 deaths
20th-century Malaysian businesspeople
Malaysian people of Hokkien descent
Malaysian people of Chinese descent
Naturalised citizens of Malaysia
Officers of the Order of the Defender of the Realm
Companions of the Order of Loyalty to the Crown of Malaysia
Commanders of the Order of Loyalty to the Crown of Malaysia
Chinese emigrants to Malaysia